Airport Regions Council (ARC) - formerly known as Airport Regions Conference, is an association of regional and local authorities with an international airport within or near their territories, founded in 1994.

Currently, the ARC has more than 30 members, ranging from regions hosting the largest hubs in Europe (e.g. Frankfurt, Madrid, etc.) to small regional airports (Oulu and Iasi).

The governance structure of the organisation includes an Executive Committee (the President and 7 members), an Assembly (ARC member regions) and a Secretariat, which is based in Brussels, Belgium.

Projects

Current projects

The ARC is part of one European Union-funded project - ANIMA (Aviation Noise Impact Management through Novel Approaches).

Past projects

Previous projects include dAIR, LAirA, DREAAM, all EU-funded projects.

ARC Members 

In August 2019, these are the members of ARC:

 Vienna City Council

 Flemish Brabant Province
 Wallonia The Walloon Company of Airports

 Prague Airport Region

 Oulu Town Council
 Uusimaa Regional Council
 Vantaa City Council

 IAU Île-de-France (Paris Region Planning and Development Agency) 
 Val d'Oise Department

 State of Berlin & State of Brandenburg
 Frankfurt Rhein-Main Regional Authority 
 Rhine-Neckar Metropolitan Region

 Budapest District XVIII

 Fingal County Council

 Transport Malta

 Mazovia Region

 Iași County Council

 Barcelona Municipal County
 Government of Catalonia
 El Prat de Llobregat Town Council
 Gavà Town Council
 Madrid City Council

 Gothenburg Region
Municipality of Härryda
 Stockholm County Council & Sigtuna

 Beek City Council 
 Drenthe Province
 Rotterdam City Council

 Akershus County Council
 Øvre Romerike Development

References

Airports in Europe
Regional policy organizations